Jiang Jixiu (born 16 July 1979) is a Chinese sitting volleyball player. She won a silver medal at the 2016 Summer Paralympics.

References

Living people
1979 births
Volleyball players at the 2016 Summer Paralympics
Chinese women's volleyball players
Volleyball players from Jiangsu
Women's sitting volleyball players
Medalists at the 2016 Summer Paralympics
Paralympic silver medalists for China
Chinese sitting volleyball players
Paralympic medalists in volleyball
21st-century Chinese women